The chief justice of the Common Pleas was the head of the Court of Common Pleas, also known as the Common Bench or Common Place, which was the second-highest common law court in the English legal system until 1875, when it, along with the other two common law courts and the equity and probate courts, became part of the High Court of Justice. As such, the chief justice of the Common Pleas was one of the highest judicial officials in England, behind only the Lord High Chancellor and the Lord Chief Justice of England, who headed the King's Bench (Queen's when the monarch was female).

History
Initially, the position of Chief Justice of the Common Pleas was not an appointment; of the justices serving in the court, one would become more respected than his peers, and was therefore considered the "chief" justice.

The position was formalised in 1272, with the raising of Sir Gilbert of Preston to Chief Justice, and from then on, it was a formally-appointed role, similar to the positions of Lord Chief Justice and Chief Baron of the Exchequer. When the High Court was created in 1875, each of the three common law courts became separate divisions of it, each headed by the person who had led the respective court before the merger.

When the Lord Chief Justice and Chief Baron died in 1880, the three common law divisions (Queen's Bench, Exchequer, and Common Pleas) were merged, and John Coleridge, the Chief Justice of the Common Pleas, became Lord Chief Justice, and the offices of Chief Justice of the Common Pleas and Chief Baron were abolished.

Chief justices of the Common Pleas

Peerages created for the Lord Chief Justice of the Common Pleas

Legacy
A Wetherspoon pub in Keswick, Cumbria is named "The Chief Justice of the Common Pleas", this is due to the current building constructed in 1901 been built on land which was formally the site of a ‘workhouse’ - founded in the will (dated 1642) of Sir John Bankes. The current building which housed the towns magistrates’ court and police station until the year 2000, was built next to the towns main post office itself constructed ten years earlier around 1890.

References

Bibliography
 

 
Chief Justice of the Common Pleas
Chief Justice of the Common Pleas